Asem River (Ci Asem) is a river in northern West Java province on Java island, Indonesia. The river rises on Mount Tangkuban Perahu and discharges into the Bay of Ciasem, Java Sea, traversing Ciasem, Subang Regency, around 90 km east of the capital Jakarta.

Hydrology 
Asem river is one of the three main rivers in the Subang Regency. There are a total of 21 rivers and 61 tributaries in the watershed area of (Daerah Aliran Sungai/DAS) Ciasem of 731.091 km2. Compared to the other two main rivers - Ci Punegara and Ci Lamaya - Asem river and its many tributaries all flow only within the Subang Regency. The river has a total length of 60 kilometer until northern coast.

Geography
The river flows in the northwest area of Java with predominantly tropical monsoon climate (designated as Am in the Köppen-Geiger climate classification). The annual average temperature in the area is 25 °C. The warmest month is September, when the average temperature is around 28 °C, and the coldest is July, at 24 °C. The average annual rainfall is 2810 mm. The wettest month is January, with an average of 454 mm rainfall, and the driest is September, with 14 mm rainfall.

See also
List of rivers of Indonesia
List of rivers of Java

References

Rivers of West Java
Rivers of Indonesia